is a railway station in Tosu, Saga Prefecture, Japan.

Lines

Layout
The station consists of two side platforms serving two tracks.

Tracks

Adjacent stations 

|-
|colspan=5 style="text-align:center;" |Kyūshū Railway Company

History 
When the Kyushu Railway was nationalized on 1 July 1907, Japanese Government Railways (JGR) took over control of the station. On 12 October 1909, the station became part of the Hitoyoshi Main Line and then on 21 November 1909, part of the Kagoshima Main Line. With the privatization of Japanese National Railways (JNR), the successor of JGR, on 1 April 1987, JR Kyushu took over control of the station. On 18 March 2006, the Tosu Freight Terminal opened just to the north of the station.

Surrounding area
Tosu Freight Terminal Station (Station of the JR Freight,It is added to the back of this station.)
Hisamitsu Pharmaceutical Kyushu Head Office

References

External links
Tashiro (JR Kyushu)

Railway stations in Saga Prefecture
Railway stations in Japan opened in 1889